Crossroads Pipeline Company is a natural gas pipeline that brings gas from Indiana to Ohio.  It is owned by TransCanada.  Its FERC code is 123.

References

External links
Pipeline Electronic Bulletin Board
TransCanada – Crossroads Pipeline – Overview

Energy in Ohio
Natural gas pipelines in the United States
Natural gas pipelines in Indiana
Natural gas pipelines in Ohio